The torpedo gunboat Almirante Lynch and her sister ship , were purchased in England and launched in 1890.

Design
The vessels had a high forecastle and poop, and a ram on the bow. the hulls were steel. The principal armament was five Whitehead torpedo tubes, one in the bow and two in each broadside. They also had two  12-pounder guns in echelon on the forecastle and one on the poop, four 3-pounder guns, and two machine guns.

Service history
Almirante Lynch was part of the small force of ships at disposal of President José Manuel Balmaceda in the 1891 Chilean Civil War. During the war, on April 23, 1891, Almirante Lynch and her sister ship Almirante Condell attacked and sank the rebel ironclad frigate . Early in April a portion of the revolutionary squadron, comprising Blanco Encalada and other ships, was sent southward for reconnoitering purposes and put into the port of Caldera. During the night of April 23, and whilst Blanco Encalada was lying quietly at anchor in Caldera Bay, Almirante Lynch, belonging to the Balmaceda faction, steamed into the bay of Caldera and discharged a torpedo at the rebel ship. Blanco Encalada sank in a few minutes and 300 of her crew perished. This coup severely weakened the Congressional squadron. This was the first successful torpedo attack on a warship.

After the arrival of the destroyer  the torpedo gunboat was renamed Tomas.

See also
 
 Sinking of USS Housatonic
 South American dreadnought race
 List of decommissioned ships of the Chilean Navy

References

External links
 Chilean Navy site Almirante Lynch

1890 ships
Almirante Lynch-class torpedo gunboats